Eiderstedt (North Frisian: Ääderstää)  is an Amt ("collective municipality") in the district of Nordfriesland, in Schleswig-Holstein, Germany. The Amt covers the peninsula of Eiderstedt, excepted for the town of Tönning.

History
On January 1, 2008, the independent municipality of Sankt Peter-Ording became part of the Amt.

Subdivision
The Amt Eiderstedt consists of the following municipalities (population in 2005 between brackets):

Garding (2,664) [town]
Garding, Kirchspiel (344) 
Grothusenkoog (20)
Katharinenheerd (173)
Kotzenbüll (236)
Norderfriedrichskoog (44)
Oldenswort (1,282)
Osterhever (246)
Poppenbüll (179)
Sankt Peter-Ording (4,177) 
Tating (990)
Tetenbüll (610)
Tümlauer-Koog (100)
Vollerwiek (224)
Welt (214)
Westerhever (129)

Coat of arms
The coat of arms displays a golden ship on a blue background with 3 sails in which are drawn, in red, a leopard, a cow and a fish.

References

External links
 Amt Eiderstedt official site
 Eiderstedt.net Eiderstedt peninsula website
 Eiderstedt peninsula website

Ämter in Schleswig-Holstein